Rhodopina seriata is a species of beetle in the family Cerambycidae. It was described by Per Olof Christopher Aurivillius in 1913. It is known from Borneo, Java, and Sumatra.

References

seriata
Beetles described in 1913